Pofi is a comune (municipality) of about 4,200 inhabitants in the province of Frosinone in the Italian region Lazio, located about  southeast of Rome and about  southeast of Frosinone.

Pofi borders the following municipalities: Arnara, Castro dei Volsci, Ceccano, Ceprano, Ripi. It is located on an extinct volcano, near the Sacco river valley. Sights include the church of Sant'Antonino Martire (11th century).

References

Cities and towns in Lazio